Waldemar Stanisław Sommertag (born 6 February 1968) is a Polish prelate of the Catholic Church who works in the diplomatic service of the Holy See. He was made an archbishop in 2018 and served as nuncio to Nicaragua from 2018 to 2022.

Biography
Sommertag was born on 6 February 1968 in Więcbork. On 30 May 1993, he was ordained a priest of the Diocese of Pelplin.

To prepare for a diplomatic career he entered the Pontifical Ecclesiastical Academy in 1998.

He earned a degree in canon law and entered the diplomatic service of the Holy See on 19 June 2000. He worked in the nunciatures in Tanzania, Nicaragua, Bosnia and Herzegovina, Israel, Palestine and Cyprus, as well as in Rome in the Section for Relations with States of the Secretariat of State.

On 15 February 2018, Pope Francis appointed him titular archbishop of Traiectum ad Mosam and Apostolic Nuncio to Nicaragua. He received his episcopal consecration from Pope Francis on 19 March. On 18 February 2019, Sommertag announced that Pope Francis had ended the suspension from priestly duties imposed on Ernesto Cardenal in 1984 for refusing to leave political office as ordered by Pope John Paul II. 

His tenure in Nicaragua was characterized by efforts to ease tension between the government and the political opposition, though the government came increasingly to view him, like the Catholic Church leadership in general, as an ally of its critics. For three years he quietly assisted in negotiations between the government and the families of its imprisoned critics, winning release for some, but he then began to use the term "political prisoners". On 18 November 2021, the Nicaraguan government decreed the abolition of the title "dean of the diplomatic corps", traditional accorded in Catholic countries to the representative of the Holy See.

On 6 March 2022, he left Nicaragua after the government withdrew its acceptance of his diplomatic status, requiring him to leave the country. The move came amid heightened conflict between the Church and the dictatorship of President Daniel Ortega. 

On 6 September 2022, Pope Francis appointed him Apostolic Nuncio to Senegal, Cabo Verde, Guinea-Bissau and Mauritania.

Notes

See also
 List of heads of the diplomatic missions of the Holy See

References

External links
 Catholic Hierarchy: Archbishop Waldemar Stanisław Sommerta 

1968 births
Living people
Apostolic Nuncios to Nicaragua
Apostolic Nuncios to Senegal
Apostolic Nuncios to Cape Verde
Apostolic Nuncios to Guinea-Bissau
Apostolic Nuncios to Mauritania
Polish Roman Catholic priests
People from Więcbork
Pontifical Ecclesiastical Academy alumni
Bishops appointed by Pope Francis
21st-century Roman Catholic titular archbishops